Education delivered through the medium of the Welsh language is known as Welsh-medium education.

Welsh-medium education should be distinguished from the teaching of the Welsh language itself as an academic subject.

16% of pupils in Wales attend Welsh-medium schools, with a further 10 percent attending schools that are bilingual, dual-medium, or in English with significant Welsh provision. The Welsh Government's current target is to increase the proportion of each school year group receiving Welsh-medium education to 30 percent by 2031, and then 40 percent by 2050.

Ysgol Glan Clwyd was the first Welsh-medium secondary (comprehensive) school, and opened in Rhyl in 1956. There are no private Welsh-medium schools in Wales, although there is one in London, the London Welsh School.

Nursery education
Mudiad Meithrin (Nursery Movement), formerly Mudiad Ysgolion Meithrin (Nursery Schools Movement) has established play groups and nurseries throughout Wales which allow children to learn Welsh through immersion. It is the main Welsh-medium education and care provider in Wales for the early years. There were 12,773 children in cylchoedd meithrin (Mudiad Meithrin playgroups) and day nurseries in 2018–2019.

The spread of such nurseries has ensured strong demand from parents for Welsh-medium primary schools. The success of Mudiad Ysgolion Meithrin inspired the Ikastolak movement in the Basque Country and the Diwan movement in Brittany.

Primary education

In the primary school sector, the numbers of children in Welsh-medium schools (or in the Welsh-medium stream of dual stream schools) has grown steadily in recent years. Welsh Government statistics show that in 2019, 22.8 per cent of 7 year old learners were assessed through the medium of Welsh (first language).  

Information taken from Schools in Wales (accessed 23 July 2010)
Update for last three years taken from School Census Results, 2012 (accessed 17 May 2013)

Secondary education
The percentage of children in Welsh-medium secondary schools is slightly less than in primary schools, but has also grown, although it appears to have stabilised in the 2010s. Including Middle School pupils from 2012/2013.

Welsh Government statistics show that in 2019, 18.5% per cent of pupils in year 9 were assessed in Welsh (first language).

Information taken from Schools in Wales (accessed 23 July 2010)
Update for last three years taken from School Census Results, 2012 (accessed 17 May 2013)

Further education 
During 2015/2016, 7.8 per cent of learning activities in the Further Education sector included some element of Welsh, with 0.29 per cent of activities offered through Welsh only. The subjects with the highest number of learning activities with some element of Welsh were Retail and Commercial Enterprise (18.1 per cent); Agriculture, Horticulture and Animal Care (17.7 per cent) and Business, Administration and Law (14.2 per cent).

Higher education 
In 2014-15, the number of higher education students with at least some learning through the medium of Welsh reached an all-time high with 6,355 students, or 5.1 per cent of all students at Welsh universities. Of these 6,355 students, 53 per cent were taught entirely through the medium of Welsh and 47 per cent were taught part of their course in Welsh. By 2020-21, the number of students at Higher Education Institutions with some learning through Welsh was 6,940, equating to 5% of all enrolments at Higher Education Institutions in Wales.

In 2020-21, the University of Wales, Trinity Saint David had both the highest number of students (3,510) and the highest proportion of its students (24 per cent) receiving at least some teaching through the medium of Welsh. Glyndŵr University and the University of South Wales had the lowest proportion of its students (0 per cent) receiving at least some teaching through the medium of Welsh.

Enrolments at Bangor University and the University of Wales, Trinity Saint David accounted for over two thirds (69 per cent) of all enrolments with at least some teaching through the medium of Welsh.

10,345 university students in Wales were fluent Welsh speakers in 2020-21, with a further 10,485 speakers recording themselves as Welsh speakers but not fluent. Of all universities in Wales, Cardiff University had the highest number of fluent Welsh-speaking students, amounting to 1,670 students. According to the latest data collected in 2020-21, Bangor University had the highest percentage of fluent Welsh-speaking students of all universities in Wales (38 per cent), followed by Aberystwyth University (30 per cent) and Swansea University (17 per cent).

See also
 Education in Wales
 Gaelscoil: Irish-medium education

References

External links
 Mudiad Meithrin: early years Welsh-medium education

Education in Wales
Minority schools
Medium of instruction
 
Education
Celtic medium education